Quintanilla de Onsoña is a municipality in the province of Palencia, in the autonomous community of Castile-Leon, Spain.

The village is located on the banks of the Carrión River. The municipal, Quintanilla, is located at 888 m altitude, 58 km far from the city of Palencia and in 2011 had 55 inhabitants (208 in the entire municipality) over an area of 52 km ².

Economy 
Agriculture, tourism and industry.

References

External links 
Information and images

Municipalities in the Province of Palencia